Sampson Cosmas (born 22 July 1953) is a Nigerian weightlifter. He competed in the men's middleweight event at the 1980 Summer Olympics.

References

1953 births
Living people
Nigerian male weightlifters
Olympic weightlifters of Nigeria
Weightlifters at the 1980 Summer Olympics
Place of birth missing (living people)